Stacey Redmond is a camogie player, and All-Ireland Senior medal with Wexford in All-Ireland Senior Camogie Championship in and a member of the panel who won the 2010 National League before injury deprived her of a chance to participate in Wexford’s 2010 and 2011 All Ireland championship victories. She returned to the inter-county panel in 2011 and was a susbsitute for the 2011 final.

Other honours
All Ireland club championship with Oulart the Ballagh 2011/2012 and player of the match. All-Ireland Senior medalist with Wexford 2007, 2011. National League Division one and Division two 2009; Ashbourne Cup with WIT 2009, 2010, 2011; Ashbourne All Star and Player of the Tournament 2009; four All-Ireland Féile na nGael 1999, 2000, 2001, 2002; Leinster Under-14 2002 (captain); Leinster Under-16 2002; Leinster and winner of All-Ireland Senior medals in Colleges with {http://www.colaistebride.ie/|Coláiste Bríde] 2003, 2004, 2005; All-Ireland Junior Colleges with Coláiste Bríde 2004; Club Senior 2003, 2004, 2005, 2006, 2007, 2009; Leinster Club Senior 2009; All Ireland club sevens 2006; Leinster Senior 2007. Stacey had the misfortune to break an ankle in a club game on the day after the National League success of 2010 and was unavailable for the All Ireland victories of 2010 and 2011.

Family background
Stacey is sister of Wexford Senior hurler, David Redmond.

References

External links
 Camogie.ie Official Camogie Association Website

1988 births
Living people
Wexford camogie players
Waterford IT camogie players